Igor Mijatović (born 21 November 1992) is a Swiss professional footballer of Serbian descent currently playing for GC Biaschesi.

Club career
Mijatović began his playing career with AC Bellinzona and rose through the youth ranks at the club. He made his debut on 2 May 2010 against FC Basel, coming on as a late substitute. He was unable to establish himself in their first team and went on loan to FC Locarno for the 2010–2011 season. He made his debut for Locarno on 26 July 2010 against FC Aarau. He scored his first and only goal during his loan in a 3–1 home loss to FC Vaduz on 22 August 2010. Mijatović returned to Bellinzona but could still not break into the first team and thus moved to GC Biaschesi on a free transfer in July 2012.

International career
Mijatović was a Switzerland youth international at under-17 and under-19 level. In 2009, he was part of the Swiss under-17 team that won the 2009 FIFA U-17 World Cup beating the host nation Nigeria 1—0 in the final. Mijatović featured as a substitute in two matches at the tournament, victories in the final group game against Brazil and the semi-final versus Colombia.

Honours
FIFA U-17 World Cup: 2009

References

External links
 

1992 births
Living people
Swiss men's footballers
Swiss people of Serbian descent
Association football forwards
AC Bellinzona players
FC Locarno players
Swiss Super League players
Swiss Challenge League players
Footballers from Geneva